Dyspessa emilia is a species of moth of the family Cossidae. It was described by Staudinger in 1878. It is found in Turkey.

References

Moths described in 1878
Dyspessa
Moths of Asia